Brey is a municipality in the district of Mayen-Koblenz in Rhineland-Palatinate, western Germany. It has a population of 1,446 (Dec. 2020).

References

Municipalities in Rhineland-Palatinate
Mayen-Koblenz